Betty Wei (born 1930) (Traditional Chinese: 魏白蒂) is a historian and a writer.

Biography 
Born in China to Hsioh-ren Wei, a Chinese scientist, educator and diplomat, Wei moved to New York City at the age of 16.  She was the first Asian student to study at the Chapin School.

She holds a bachelor's degree in Political Science from Bryn Mawr College and a master's degree in International Relations and Law from New York University.

In 1975, she moved to Hong Kong with her husband and later went to pursue a doctorate degree in  Modern Chinese History at the University of Hong Kong. She has served as the Head of Liberal Arts and Interdisciplinary Studies at the Hong Kong Academy for Performing Arts from 1994 until her retirement in 2003. She is currently an Honorary Research Fellow at the Centre of Asian Studies at the University of Hong Kong, Honorary Professor at the Institute of Qing History, Renmin University of China and a member of the Royal Asiatic Society Hong Kong Branch.

Publications 
 Shanghai: Crucible of Modern China (New York: Oxford University Press, 1987)
 Old Shanghai (New York: Oxford University Press, 1993)
 Liu Chi-Wen: biography of a revolutionary leader (Hong Kong: The Liu Chi-Wen Family, 2005)
 Ruan Yuan, 1764-1849: The Life And Work of a Major Scholar-official in Nineteenth Century China Before the Opium War (Hong Kong: Hong Kong University Press, 2006)

External links
 Betty Wei's Profile at the Royal Asiatic Society

1930 births
Living people
Bryn Mawr College alumni
New York University alumni
Chapin School (Manhattan) alumni